"Chameleon" is the third and final segment of the second episode of the first season (1985–86) of the television series The Twilight Zone. In this segment, a team of scientists contend with a shape-shifting alien.

Plot
On an American Space Shuttle orbiting Earth, the onboard camera malfunctions and the astronauts shut it off. On Earth, technician Gerald Tyson and Crew Chief Simmons work on the shuttle after it lands; Simmons detaches the camera and takes it to be repaired. A blue light flashes and he disintegrates. Tyson calls an emergency alert. The camera is put in an isolation chamber using a robot. As the scientists discuss what happened to Simmons, there is a bright flash in the isolation chamber, and the camera transforms into Simmons. He demands to be let out.

Realizing that "Simmons" is some sort of shape-shifting creature, the scientists insist on holding him for examination. Simmons disappears in another flash of light, turning into Simmons' wife Kathy, who tells them nothing is wrong with Simmons and to release him. After the nonsensicality of this request is pointed out, the creature turns back into Simmons and starts breaking valuable samples stored in the isolation room. The scientists subdue him with sleeping gas. Dr. Vaughn Heilman enters the chamber to give Simmons a sedative so they can restore normal atmosphere for examination procedures. However, Simmons awakes and grabs his hands. They both disappear in a flash of light and are replaced by a nuclear bomb. The scientists realize that while the creature may have assumed only the form of a bomb, it is also possible that it used Dr. Heilman's knowledge as a bomb expert for the U.S. nuclear weapons program to shift into a working bomb.

Dr. Curt Lockridge negotiates with the creature, saying that they will allow it to go free. When the timer reaches one, the creature turns into Heilman and runs through the open door with Lockridge at its heels. Heilman is confronted at a launch platform. Lockridge asks it to let the doctor and Simmons free. The creature claims that they are not prisoners, and stay within him due to their "thirst". The creature asks Lockridge to come with them, but Lockridge declines. He asks why the creature came to Earth. It replies, "Curiosity" before changing into a glowing gaseous cloud that flies away.

Production
The opening scene is actually NASA footage shot in outer space. NASA were reluctant to allow the use of the footage and the NASA logo after they read the script, concerned that a story about NASA astronauts bringing a dangerous alien back to Earth would be bad publicity, but were eventually persuaded.

The observation booth set was small, with director Wes Craven complaining during the filming that he didn't have enough room to work in.

References

External links
 

1985 American television episodes
The Twilight Zone (1985 TV series season 1) episodes
NASA in fiction
Television episodes about alien visitations

fr:Rencontre du cinquième type